The 1994–95 Belarusian Extraliga season was the third season of the Belarusian Extraliga, the top level of ice hockey in Belarus. Seven teams participated in the first round, and six teams participated in the final round, which was won by Tivali Minsk.

First round

Playoffs

Semifinals 
 Polimir Novopolotsk - Belstal Zhlobin 0:2 (0:5, 2:6)
 Triumph Minsk - HK Torpedo Minsk 1:2 (1:3, 7:2, 3:4)

3rd place 
 Triumph Minsk - Polimir Novopolotsk 2:0 (6:3, 4:2)

Final
 Belstal Zhlobin - HK Torpedo Minsk 2:1 (3:8, 6:3, 6:4)

Final round

External links
Season on hockeyarchives.info

Belarusian Extraleague
Belarusian Extraleague seasons
Extra